Sandy Civic Center station is a light rail station in Sandy, Utah, United States serviced by the Blue Line of Utah Transit Authority's TRAX light rail system. The Blue Line provides service from Downtown Salt Lake City to Draper. Prior to the opening of the Draper extension in 2013, this station was the southernmost on the Blue Line. The station opened on December 4, 1999, as part of the first operating segment of the TRAX system on the Sandy/University Line.

Description 
The Sandy Civic Center station is located at 115 East Sego Lily Drive (10000 South) and is easily accessed from State Street (US-89) by heading east on Sego Lily Drive or from 700 East (SR-71) by heading west on Sego Lily Drive. The station is just southeast of Jordan High School on a hill overlooking Sandy's downtown area and major destinations such as the Shops at South Town to the west.

The station has a free Park and Ride lot; previously, it had nearly 1,200 free parking spaces available, though surface parking is being removed and developed into apartments, offices, and retail. The park-and-ride will soon relocate to a new parking garage serving Sandy's East Village developments.

The East Village 

The station is home to Sandy's first transit-oriented development known as the East Village, a  project part of Sandy City's revitalization plan. The East Village is under construction as of March 2017, with three multi-family residential buildings complete and one under construction; one office building complete and others under development; and retail space under planning for a late 2017 groundbreaking.

Bus connections 
Bus routes are current as of Change Day on April 18, 2021.
UTA Route 201 – State Street South
UTA Route F514 – 300 West Flex
UTA Route F546 – Draper Flex

References

External links 
Official UTA website
Official TRAX website

TRAX (light rail) stations
Railway stations in the United States opened in 1999
Railway stations in Salt Lake County, Utah
1999 establishments in Utah